Armond is a Canadian community in Carleton County, New Brunswick.

History

Notable people

See also
List of communities in New Brunswick

References

Communities in Carleton County, New Brunswick